The Cabinet of Eduard Heger is the incumbent government of Slovakia, led by Prime Minister Eduard Heger. It is a dismissed minority coalition government with restricted powers, consisting of three parties – Ordinary People and Independent Personalities (OĽaNO), We Are Family, and For the People. The coalition originally included a fourth party, Freedom and Solidarity (SaS), which guaranteed a parliamentary majority. Following a coalition crisis in summer 2022, SaS left the government, which resulted in a minority government.

The Cabinet was appointed by the President of Slovakia Zuzana Čaputová on 1 April 2021 and was approved by the National Council on 4 May 2021. It was formed after the previous Prime Minister Igor Matovič and his government had resigned, ending a month-long coalition crisis which started because of a controversial Sputnik V COVID-19 vaccine purchase by Matovič. It was essentially a reshuffle during which Matovič changed positions with his party subordinate Heger, previously Minister of Finance. Significant changes included the appointment of Vladimír Lengvarský as Minister of Health and President Čaputová rejecting the initial We Are Family nominee for Labour Minister Jozef Hlinka, which resulted in the reappointment of Milan Krajniak. The Cabinet fell when losing a no-confidence vote on December 15, 2022.

Composition

Coalition crisis

Background

Personal attacks 
Tensions within the government grew over time since the formation of the Cabinet of Igor Matovič. In December 2020, then-PM Matovič publicly called Richard Sulík an "idiot" in a Rádio Expres talkshow Braňo Závodský Naživo, blaming him for problems during the handling of Covid-19 pandemic. He also repeatedly claimed that if Sulík had not "toppled" Radičová's Cabinet in 2011, this would not have led to a preliminary election and the subsequent overwhelming victory of Smer-SD led by Robert Fico, and that this ultimately led to the 2018 murder of investigative journalist Ján Kuciak and his fiancée Martina Kušnírová. In fact, the vote about ESM bailout for Greece, which SaS was against at the time, was connected with a vote of confidence in the government by then-PM Radičová, and by abstaining, both Sulík and Matovič (then an independent MP) contributed to the National Council not expressing confidence in the government. This essentially meant the fall of Radičová's Cabinet. Radičová herself later stated that one of her advisors unsuccessfully tried to persuade Matovič to take a different position shortly before the vote took place.

Following the formation of Heger's Cabinet, Sulík took a stance of not responding to Matovič's personal attacks for over a year, though he was criticized by various journalists for saying that Matovič was in a "manic phase" when he announced one of his proposals that SaS was against, and which were often seen by critics as whimsical, amateur and grandiose. 

In June 2022, SaS announced they would stop attending meetings of coalition leaders due to alleged repeated personal attacks by Matovič at these meetings. They continued attending the official cabinet sessions. Leader of We Are Family and Speaker of the National Council Boris Kollár organized a meeting between PM Heger, Sulík and himself in order to achieve the return of SaS to the coalition meetings. According to Sulík, PM Heger promised that Matovič's attacks would stop. When questioned about this, Matovič replied that Heger has not told him anything so far, that he also sometimes promises something which is not in his control, and that he will see how Edo (diminutive, meaning PM Heger) is going to accomplish this. Following these statements, SaS decided not to return to the meetings.

The "pro-family package" bill 
In November 2021, Igor Matovič, as Minister of Finance, introduced a planned tax reform in three parts titled "Tax Revolution Makes Dreams Come True". The first part of this planned reform was focused on the social welfare aspect, namely helping families with children, and how these families would receive an extra income of €200. In April 2022, coalition representatives excluding those from SaS introduced planned changes with Matovič's "pro-family package" part of the previously introduced reform being the priority to be passed first. This 'package' of changes to the law was also branded as "anti-inflation". SaS strongly criticized the proposal, reasoning that it is not pro-family (as poorer families would receive less money and the wealthier families would receive more money). They also criticized that these expenses were to be paid by raising taxes for a select number of top-earning companies, as well as by taking funds away from local administration. They further criticized the intention to pass these changes in a shortened legislative process which is designed for use in emergencies only. Various experts (and SaS) criticized not only the shortened legislative process, but also that the bill is not anti-inflationary, being simply an updated version of proposals introduced by Matovič in 2021. His idea to fund extra-curricular activities for children and create 500 new administrative jobs for this purpose, costing €9 million, was also criticized. The total cost of the bill would be €1.2 billion every year.

MP Martin Beluský from the far-right, Neo-Nazi opposition party ĽSNS stated that the party was in talks about the proposal and that they were considering supporting it should their proposals be incorporated into the bill. On 24 May the parliament passed the bill by 83 out of 150 votes. ĽSNS MPs supported the bill and it included the proposed changes they had wished to be made (families whose children didn't go to school would only receive half the money). This was widely criticized as discriminating against children from poor families where parents neglect their responsibility to care about their children's education and children from the Roma ethnic minority. OĽANO did not admit any official negotiations with ĽSNS but when Matovič was asked during a political debate about shaking hands with Beluský, he stated that Beluský is one of the ten most intelligent MPs in the parliament. The votes of ĽSNS helped to pass the bill but were not decisive as For the People MPs also supported it.

President Čaputová vetoed the bill (excluding the immediate welfare measures), reasoning that it was passed in shortened legislative process in 6 days without the necessary emergency reasons, and also criticizing parts of the bill as potentially discriminatory. She stated that should the veto be broken and the bill passed, she would challenge it at the Supreme Court.

On 22 June, the parliament broke the veto and passed the bill, now with only 77 out of 150 MPs supporting it. For the People MPs did not vote for the bill and it only passed because of the ĽSNS MPs' support. Immediately after the vote, SaS strongly criticized the way in which it was passed, with the help of "fascists". Matovič reacted by claiming that it was SaS which allied itself with "fascists", meaning the independent opposition MPs for Republic (formerly MPs for ĽSNS), as well as with Smer-SD and independents for Voice-SD by not voting for the bill.

On 27 June Matovič and PM Heger held a press conference at which they urged SaS to return to the coalition meetings. Matovič apologized for his attacks and said that OĽANO would forgive the "365 attacks in four days" allegedly made by SaS. The party did not return to the coalition meetings.

Following the breaking of her veto, President Čaputová asked the Supreme Court to examine the bill's compliance with the law and to render it ineffective, stating the reasons she had previously articulated. The Supreme Court later confirmed that parts of the bill were, in fact, unlawful, and that the use of the shortened legislative process was not warranted.

SaS ultimatum 
The coalition crisis started on 6 July 2022 when SaS announced their withdrawal from the coalition. They presented the remaining parties of the coalition with an ultimatum. Their key demand was that Igor Matovič no longer continue as Minister of Finance. As long as this demand was met, they were willing to discuss the terms of a new coalition agreement and continue in the four-party government. Should OĽaNO fail to meet this demand by 31 August, all four ministers appointed by SaS would resign. This included Deputy Prime Minister and Minister of Economy Richard Sulík, Minister of Foreign Affairs Ivan Korčok, Minister of Justice Mária Kolíková, and Minister of Education Branislav Gröhling. SaS claimed that this nearly two-month ultimatum was appropriately timed since the summer period is usually a time of political inactivity as the National Council does not hold any sessions.

The main reason for leaving the coalition and the ultimatum that was cited by SaS were the actions of Igor Matovič as Minister of Finance. They cited Matovič's breaking of the President's veto of the "pro-family package" with the help of MPs from the far-right, Neo-Nazi ĽSNS party (it was unacceptable for SaS that the government be aided by these far-right MPs when passing laws). They argued that they cannot continue in a government where Matovič announces his own grandiose ideas immediately prior to attempting to pass them as laws without previously consulting the other coalition partners or letting the proposals be subjected to a regular public debate and potential objections (by other government officials, various experts, and the general public), a mandatory process required by law for regular government bill proposals. The so-called "pro-family package" was used as the main example. They also criticized his tendency to get into personal conflict with individuals who disagree (even if done in a constructive manner). SaS stated that since Prime Minister Heger failed to intervene and solve these issues, they decided to take this step.

OĽaNO supports Matovič 
An OĽaNO MP and chair of the parliamentary defense and security committee Juraj Krúpa announced his leaving of the OĽaNO party and joining of the SaS parliamentary caucus. He also became the team leader for defense within SaS. Krúpa stated that the reasons for these decisions were the orthodox support for party leader Matovič within OĽaNO (not being allowed to present a critical speech at a ceremonial party congress) and his dissatisfaction with what he characterized as the changing orientation of the party to "ultraconservative". Krúpa was the only OĽaNO MP who did not vote for the "pro-family package" bill.

The leading coalition party OĽaNO announced on 11 August that the party leadership along with their parliamentary caucus decided that Matovič would remain Minister of Finance even after the ultimatum by SaS comes to an end.

Three official meetings of the former coalition leaders from all four parties took place in the government's Hotel Bôrik. During these negotiations, PM Heger presented a 5-point plan for a continued coalition. These included that Matovič and Sulík do not attend the coalition meetings, OĽaNO and SaS swapping the ministries of Finance and Economy, the creation of a 12-member referee committee which would rule on disagreements within the coalition with SaS having the key vote in instances of a tie, sanctions for breaking agreements such as the loss of a committee chair or a minister, and defining a plan for helping the citizens in the coming period. SaS consistently refused to retract its ultimatum but Richard Sulík made clear that should OĽaNO require that he step down as a price for Matovič's resignation, he would be willing to do so.

On 31 August, the last day of the ultimatum, OĽaNO announced that Matovič could resign if SaS agrees to ten proposals by OĽaNO. These included various policies which SaS disagreed with long-term such as tax raises, support for some form of the "pro-family package", and a point which said that SaS ministers or MPs would not be able to propose new laws requiring public spending without proposing the resources which should be used to cover these new expenses. This last point was interpreted by multiple SaS members as an attempted restriction that would not be imposed on any other of the three coalition parties in case SaS agreed.

However, the 10-point proposal by OĽaNO was promptly rejected by SaS and Richard Sulík announced that he had already made the President aware of his resignation as Minister of Economy earlier that day. SaS further stated that Matovič had until 5 September to resign, otherwise the resignation of the remaining three ministers for SaS would follow.

In September, the parliamentary caucus of We Are Family was joined by three independent MPs, among them a former ĽSNS MP Jozef Šimko.

Ministers resign 
Since OĽaNO decided that Igor Matovič would remain, Korčok, Kolíková and Gröhling announced their resignation on 5 September and President Zuzana Čaputová accepted their resignation on 13 September. She appointed cross-party nominees Rastislav Káčer as Minister of Foreign Affairs, Viliam Karas as Minister of Justice, and Karel Hirman as Minister of Economy. PM Heger was appointed Interim Minister of Education until the appointment of Ján Horecký on 4 October.

Minority government

No-confidence vote in Matovič 
After the government lost its majority, SaS, now an opposition party, signaled that they would be willing to discuss terms of their return to the government should Igor Matovič be removed as Minister of Finance. In the parliament, they initiated a motion of no-confidence in Matovič. During the debate Matovič spoke in his own defense and attacked the media in his speeches. In response, an open letter condemning these attacks was issued by the representatives of the most prominent Slovak media outlets. Several international press organizations also condemned the attacks. 

The motion ended up being unsuccessful as three votes were missing for Matovič to be removed from his office.  

The decisive factor were three independent MPs for the opposition Life-NP party (gained their mandate by running for the ĽSNS party) who did not take part in the vote despite being present in the chamber. 

Nine OĽANO MPs from the newly-formed Civic and Democratic Platform, who condemned their party leader's attacks on the press and called for efforts to be made so that a stable democratic majority could be reestablished, were not present. Three MPs from the coalition party For the People were also not present. 

Following the vote, SaS pointed out that Matovič was not removed only because of the three opposition MPs (who ran for ĽSNS) did not vote in favor of the motion, even though previously these MPs consistently voted in favor of no-confidence motions concerning ministers of Heger's (and previously Matovič's) Cabinet. SaS also pointed out that shortly after the vote, some coalition MPs supported three bills introduced by the three Life-NP independents. SaS announced that they would no longer seek to return to the government.

No-confidence vote in government 
On 29 November, President Čaputová made a yearly State of the Republic speech in the National Council in which she strongly criticized the government. She stated that an early election would be preferable should the government prove to be unable to solve the current political crisis, warning that it could result in a serious crisis of democracy if unsolved.

Two days later, SaS announced that they would initiate a motion of no-confidence in Heger's Cabinet, reasoning that PM Heger is "invisible" when it comes to domestic politics, and that Igor Matovič is the de facto leader of the government, along with Boris Kollár. 

They reasoned that the government is no longer anti-corruption. As an example, they mentioned a vote in which the MPs voted against allowing for the former PM Robert Fico to face a judicial decision which could result in his being taken into custody (two OĽANO MPs did not vote in favor of this, for which they were excluded from the OĽANO parliamentary caucus). Another example they used was the coalition not willing to alter or cancel a controversial part of the criminal law (§ 363), claiming that the incumbent Prosecutor General Maroš Žilinka was misusing it to obstruct criminal proceedings against politicians and highly influential individuals suspected of serious crime. 

Among other points, SaS also heavily criticized the proposed budget, as well as the government's approach during extensive negotiations with the doctors' trade union. Richard Sulík stated that should the motion be successful, any possible outcome (a reshuffled government, caretaker government appointed by the President, or an early election) would be preferable to the current government. 

SaS did not have enough votes to submit this motion; they were joined by Voice-SD MPs led by former PM Peter Pellegrini.

MP Martin Klus left the SaS parliamentary caucus, and later the party itself, over these decisions.

13 December 
On Tuesday 13 December, the originally-scheduled day of the vote, a majority voted to postpone the vote by two days until Thursday. This was achieved with the votes of the three Life-NP MPs voted into the parliament on the ĽSNS party ticket. They argued that they helped to postpone the vote in order to negotiate with the government about the possibility of supporting the government under the condition that an early election would be agreed upon, thus allowing the government to retain competencies it would lose if it were to lose confidence in the upcoming vote. 

The Civic and Democratic platform of OĽANO along with other coalition MPs Juraj Šeliga and Jana Žitňanská of For the People, and independents Ján Mičovský and Martin Klus, stated that the two days would create space for an agreement to be reached with SaS even at the cost of a cabinet reshuffle, rejecting the possibility of an early election.

15 December 
On Thursday 15 December, the day of the vote, a press conference took place at which Igor Matovič offered to resign as Minister of Finance under the condition that SaS withdraw their no-confidence motion and pledge support to the proposed budget. Following this offer, PM Heger, along with Minister of Environment Ján Budaj then further negotiated with Sulík and other SaS representatives. SaS ultimately issued a press announcement rejecting the offer, stating that Matovič should have resigned in earnest, and that the proposed budget is irresponsible with NGEU funds potentially at risk if it were to pass.

At the beginning of the vote, it was further postponed by 20 minutes at the request of the OĽANO's parliamentary caucus chair Michal Šipoš, and then again to allow for an MPs' gremium meeting. During these delays Igor Matovič went to the Presidential Palace, signed his resignation and handed it to the President's Chief of Staff who then passed it onto his assistant in order to make a copy. When the assistant returned the original and the copy of the resignation to the Chief of Staff, Matovič took both documents from his hands, said he changed his mind, and left. 

Preceding the vote in the parliament, all OĽANO MPs except one left the chamber to signal their support of the Cabinet. The vote was successful as 78 out of 150 MPs voted in favor of the no-confidence motion. MPs who voted for the motion included Ján Krošlák, Martin Borguľa (both left We Are Family two days prior) and Patrick Linhart (left We Are Family earlier on 15 December). For the government to fall at least 76 MPs had to vote for the motion, which meant that the motion would be unsuccessful without the support of these formerly-coalition MPs.

Richard Sulík later confirmed that SaS was prepared to vote to either delay the vote in order to further negotiate or recall the motion altogether had Matovič handed in his resignation.

Cabinet with restricted powers 
Following the vote of no-confidence, President Čaputová formally dismissed the Cabinet of Eduard Heger, and appointed it as interim government with restricted powers.

Ten OĽANO MPs from the Civic and Democratic Platform who were advocating for a cabinet reshuffle left the OĽANO parliamentary caucus, reasoning they no longer had impact on the decisions of OĽANO.

On 22 December, the parliament passed the 2023 budget with a deficit of €8 billion. SaS supported the budget after several of its proposals were worked in following negotiations with PM Heger. These included expenditure limits, cancellation of concession fees to fund the state TV and radio, and a lowered 10% tax on hospitality and sports venues services.

Following the passing of the budget, Matovič agreed to no longer serve as Minister of Finance. President Čaputová removed Matovič from the office and appointed PM Heger as Interim Minister of Finance on 23 December.

After being removed from the office, Matovič shared multiple posts using his Facebook profile centered around LGBT issues. In these posts, he attacked the Slovak mainstream news media, President Čaputová, and non-parliamentary party Progressive Slovakia, alleging that their aim is to push "transgender propaganda" at schoolchildren in Slovakia. Heger then openly criticized Matovič, and both admitted that the departure of Heger and Minister of Defense Jaroslav Naď from OĽANO was likely in the close future.

Attempts for a new majority 
On 9 January 2023, Eduard Heger announced that he would attempt to form a new government supported by a parliamentary majority.

He gained the support of a large number of OĽANO MPs, the group of former OĽANO MPs from the Civic and Democratic Platform led by Ján Budaj, and For the People MPs. 

We Are Family took the position of only supporting any such majority should an early election be agreed upon. 

SaS initially stated that they were prepared to negotiate and had clear ideas about how to proceed, but then rejected any discussions about supporting a possible new majority. One of the reasons given was that Heger was apparently not the real leader of OĽANO as it was still being led by Matovič, and that not even all OĽANO MPs pledged their support (Matovič himself did not give his signature, claiming he wanted to be the last one to do so and only under the condition that the Minister of Economy Karel Hirman were not part of such government; MP György Gyimesi also did not give his support). SaS further pointed out that OĽANO's own coalition partner We Are Family were calling for an early election, and that if Heger were to leave OĽANO (as it was being openly communicated) he would lack the legitimacy to form a government as Prime Minister. 

Following this, Heger announced his attempts to form a new majority were ended. Subsequently, the parliament changed the Constitution so that an early election could be called, while also amending the law so that the general election voting system could only be changed by a qualified majority (90 out of 150 MPs). A parliamentary majority then voted for an early election to be held on 30 September 2023.

Current coalition

Notes

References

External links
 Website of the Slovak Government

Government of Slovakia
Cabinets established in 2021
Freedom and Solidarity
Slovak government cabinets
2021 establishments in Slovakia
Current governments